Great Tom is the hour bell in Tom Tower, at Christ Church, Oxford.

Great Tom can also mean:

 Great Tom of Lincoln, the hour bell at Lincoln Cathedral, Lincoln.

See also

 Bourdon bell.